Griscelli syndrome type 2 (also known as "partial albinism with immunodeficiency") is a rare autosomal recessive syndrome characterized by variable cutenous albinism, silver colored metallic looking hair, frequent bacterial or viral infections, neutropenia, and thrombocytopenia.

Presentation

All types of Griscelli syndrome have distinctive skin and hair coloring. 

Type 1 is associated with neurological abnormalities. These include delayed development, intellectual disability, seizures, hypotonia and eye abnormalities.

Type 2 - unlike type 1 - is not associated with primary neurological disease but is associated with an uncontrolled T lymphocyte expansion and macrophage activation syndrome. It is often associated with the hemophagocytic syndrome. This latter condition may be fatal in the absence of bone marrow transplantation.

Persons with type 3 have the typical light skin and hair coloring but are otherwise normal.

Genetics

There are three types of Griscelli syndrome. 

Type 1 is associated with mutations in the MYO5A gene

Type 2 is associated with mutations in RAB27A gene. 

Both these genes are located on the long arm of chromosome 15 (15q21).

Type 3 is associated with mutations in the MLPH gene.

All types are inherited in an autosomal recessive fashion.

Diagnosis

Differential diagnosis

This includes Chediak-Higashi syndrome and Elejalde syndrome (neuroectodermal melanolysosomal disease).

Treatment

History

This syndrome was first described in 1978. In 2000 types 1 and 2 were distinguished.

See also

Griscelli syndrome

References

External links 

 

Disturbances of human pigmentation
Syndromes